Chittagong District, renamed the Chattogram District, is a district located in the south-eastern region of Bangladesh. It is a part of the Chittagong Division. The port city of Chittagong , which is the second largest city in Bangladesh, is located within this district.

History

Because of the natural harbour, Chittagong had been an important location for trade, drawing Arab traders as early as the 9th century CE. The region fell under the rule of kings from Arakan in the 16th and 17th centuries, but later, the Mughal Army under Shaista Khan conquered Chittagong. During the 17th century, the region also faced a lot of attacks by Portuguese pirates. The Mughals established Chittagong as a district in 1666. Chittagong is the 2nd largest district in Bangladesh by population and area. The Chittagong Hill Tracts were separated from Chittagong in 1860. In 1947, Chittagong came under Pakistan and became part a district of East Pakistan. Port of Chittagong was a big spot for exports and imports of Pakistan. After the liberation of Bangladesh, Cox's Bazar District was separated in 1984.

Administration
 Administrator of Zila Porishod: M A Salam
 Deputy Commissioner (DC): Mohammad Elius Hossain

Subdivisions
There are 15 upazilas and 31 thanas within Chittagong District. There are 16 Thanas for the Chattogram Metropolitan Police covered area including the Karnaphuli Upazila, 2 for Mirsharai Upazila, and 1 for each of the remaining 13 upazilas.

The upazilas are:

 Anwara Upazila
 Banshkhali Upazila
 Boalkhali Upazila
 Chandanaish Upazila
 Fatikchhari Upazila
 Hathazari Upazila
 Karnaphuli Upazila
 Lohagara Upazila
 Mirsharai Upazila
 Patiya Upazila
 Rangunia Upazila
 Raozan Upazila
 Sandwip Upazila
 Satkania Upazila
 Sitakunda Upazila

The thanas for the Chattogram Metropolitan Police covered area are:

 Akbar Shah Thana
 Bakoliya Thana
 Bandar Thana
 Bayazid Bostami Thana
 Chandgaon Thana
 Chawkbazar Thana
 Chittagong Kotwali Thana
 Double Mooring Thana
 EPZ Thana
 Halishahar Thana
 Karnaphuli Thana
 Khulshi Thana
 Pahartali Thana
 Panchlaish Thana
 Patenga Thana
 Sadarghat Thana

The thanas for the Mirsharai Upazila are:

 Jorargonj Thana
 Mirsharai Thana

Demographics

According to the 2011 Bangladesh census, Chittagong District had a population of 7,616,352, of which 3,838,854 were males and 3,777,498 females. Rural population was 4,463,723 (58.61%) while the urban population was 3,152,629 (41.39%). Chittagong district had a literacy rate of 58.91% for the population 7 years and above: 61.13% for males and 56.56% for females.

Religion 

Chittagong is multi-religious. Muslims are in majority with 86.90%, while Hindus and Buddhists are 11.31% and 1.59% respectively. Chittagong has the largest population of Hindus of any district in Bangladesh. Most of the Buddhists are Baruas and their population is decreasing with emigration, while Muslims and Hindus are both increasing in numbers, with Hindus growing more slowly.

Chittagong District has 13,148 mosques, 1025 Hindu temples, 535 Buddhist temples and 192 churches. Fakira Mosque in Hathazari, Musa Khan Mosque, Hafez Para Jame Mosque in Putibila, LOHAGARA, Kura Katni Mosque, Hashimpur Kadam Rasool Mosque in Chandanaish, the 16th century Kala Mosques, Chhuti Khan Mosque, Kadam Mobara Mosque, Andar Killah Mosque, Bakshi Hamid Mosque of Bashkhali, and East Gomdandi Chowdhury Para Old Mosque of Boalkhali are famous mosques in Chittagong. Also Badar Awlia Dargah is a tomb in Chittagong.

The ethnic population is 32,165, consisting mainly of Tripuris and Chakmas.

Education 
Colleges
Kulgaon City Corporation College
Gachbaria Govt. College
Patiya Govt. College
Chittagong Cantonment Public College
Chittagong College
Satbaria Oli Ahmad Bir Bikram College
Anowara Govt. College
Govt. Hazi Mohammad Mohsin College
Govt. City College
Govt. Commerce College
Nasirabad Govt. Woman College
Faujdarhat Cadet College
Chittagong Polytechnic Institute
Chittagong Mohila Polytechnic Institute
Halishahar Cantonment Public School and College
Chunati Government Girls College, LOHAGARA

Universities
Chittagong University
Chittagong University of Engineering & Technology
BGC Trust University Bangladesh
International Islamic University Chittagong
East Delta University
Premier University, Chittagong
Chittagong Veterinary and Animal Sciences University
Chittagong Medical University
University of Science and Technology, Chittagong
University of Creative Technology, Chittagong
Southern University Bangladesh

Medical colleges
Chittagong Medical College
BGC Trust Medical College, Chandanaish
CHİTTAGONG DENTAL COLLEGE

Language and Culture 
Chittagong's official language is Bangla but they have their own language which is called Chittagonian language. This language is distinct from Bangla. It has its own grammar, phonology and vocabulary.

Notable people

Binod Bihari Chawdhury
Nuton Chandra Singha
 Nurul Abedin
 Oli Ahmad
 Mahbubul Alam
 Mohit Ul Alam
 Ayub Bachchu
 Shyam Sundar Baishnab
 Partha Barua
 Abdul Karim Sahitya Bisharad
 Abdul Haq Choudhury
 Shantanu Biswas
 Sri Chinmoy
 Pramod Ranjan Choudhury
 Mehazabien Chowdhury
 Rony Chowdhury
 Salahuddin Quader Chowdhury
 Sarat Chandra Das
 Maitreyi Devi
 Charles John Stanley Gough
 Ehsanul Haque
 Enamul Haque (cricketer, born 1966)
 Enamul Haque (writer)
 Chandra Kalindi Roy Henriksen
 Rabiul Hoque
 Somnath Hore
 Ashraful Hossain
 Nazmul Huq 
 Tamim Iqbal
 Mamunul Islam
 Nurul Islam (physician)
 Mirza Ahmad Ispahani
 Rubayyat Jahan
 Binoy Bashi Joldas 
 Abul Kashem Khan
 Akram Khan (cricketer)
 Allauddin Khan
 Dawlat Wazir Bahram Khan
 Morshed Khan
 Dipa Ma
 Anandamayi Ma
 Abdul Mannan (educator)
 Nusrat Faria Mazhar
 Adolph Medlycott
 Minhajul Abedin
 A. B. M. Mohiuddin Chowdhury
 Moniruzzaman (Chittagong Division cricketer)
 Anagarika Munindra
 Masuma Rahman Nabila
 Wasfia Nazreen
 Ayub Quadri
 Gulamur Rahman
 Mojibur Rahman
 Mihir Rakshit
 Ramesh Shil
 Tridev Roy
 Bibi Russell
 Iftekhar Sajjad
 Blanaid Salkeld
 Anupam Sen
 Nabinchandra Sen
 Surya Sen
 Jatindra Mohan Sengupta
 Nikhil Baran Sengupta
 Jiban Ghoshal
 Tarakeswar Dastidar
 Ahmed Sharif
 Lokman Khan Sherwani
 L. K. Siddiqi
 Shahidul Yousuf Sohel
 Jack Stephens (set decorator)
 Suddhananda Mahathero
 Sukomal Barua
 Pritilata Waddedar
 Yasir Ali (Bangladeshi cricketer)
 Monica Yunus
 Muhammad Yunus
 Zamor
 Rajat Sen
 Minar Rahman

See also
 Chittagong
 Chittagong Division
 Divisions of Bangladesh

Notes

References

External links
 Official Web Portal of Chittagong District

 
Districts of Chittagong Division
Districts of Bangladesh
Districts of Bangladesh established before 1971